Frost Great Outdoors (FGO) was an American television network, operated as a joint venture between Luken Communications and Frost Cutlery, a cutlery manufacturer based in Ooltewah, Tennessee. FGO began programming in late fall 2011. The network did not yet have a website, and the network carried outdoor programming, along with home shopping from Frost Cutlery during certain hours, mostly on weekends.

WBON-LD in East Bernstadt, Kentucky was the last sole affiliate to carry the network, until January 31, 2020, when WBON discontinued the network & replaced it with a simulcast of their third subchannel, resulting in the discontinuation of the network.

Former Affiliates

References

External links
 Luken Communications website
 Frost Cutlery

Television channels and stations established in 2011
Television channels and stations disestablished in 2020
English-language television stations in the United States
Defunct television networks in the United States
Sports television networks in the United States